Malin GAA is a Gaelic games club based in Malin in County Donegal, Ireland.

It is the northernmost GAA club in Ireland. This tends to cause logistical struggles during the league as many of their rivals are a great distance away. One example of the distance travelled would be the 320-kilometre round trip required to play an away fixture to Naomh Columba.

History
The club participated in the Donegal Senior Football Championship from 2004 onwards.

It was also club of the year in 2003.

Declan Walsh, a member of the 2012 All-Ireland winning county team, played for them.

The club is also home to 2012's "Number One Real Supporter", according to a national survey.

Liam Bradley, previously manager of the Antrim county football team, was an unexpected managerial appointment by the club in January 2015. He left the same year.

The 2019 Donegal Senior Football Championship resulted in the club's descent to the intermediate ranks.

Notable players

 Declan Walsh — 2012 All-Ireland SFC winner; 2011, 2012, and 2014 Ulster SFC winner; 2010 Ulster Under-21 Football Championship winner; 2006 Ulster MFC winner

Managers

References

External links
 Official website

Gaelic games clubs in County Donegal
Gaelic football clubs in County Donegal